Haloparvum (common abbreviation Hpv.) is a genus of halophilic archaea in the family of Haloferacaceae.

References

Archaea genera
Taxa described in 2016
Euryarchaeota